Carnell Augustino Lake (born July 15, 1967) is an American former professional football player and coach who is the defensive coordinator for the Memphis Showboats of the United States Football League (USFL). He was a safety and cornerback in the National Football League (NFL). He is a member of the NFL 1990s All-Decade Team.  He was the cornerbacks coach for the UCLA Bruins under head coach Rick Neuheisel in 2009 before leaving after one season for family reasons. He was the Pittsburgh Steelers defensive backs coach until February 2018.

College career
Lake played linebacker for the UCLA Bruins from 1985 through 1988.  He finished his college career with 45.5 tackles for loss and 25.5 sacks.  Those totals, as of the 2016 season, are 1st and 4th in UCLA football history.

NFL career
On January 15, 1989, Lake played in the East-West Shrine Game and was part of the West who lost 24–6 to the East. On January 21, 1989, Lake was part of Los Angeles Rams' head coach John Robinson's South team that defeated the North 13–12. Lake played safety in both games as multiple teams were interested in moving him to safety as he was considered to be too small to continue to play linebacker professionally.

Pittsburgh Steelers
The Pittsburgh Steelers selected Lake in the second round (34th overall) of the 1989 NFL Draft. Lake was the third safety drafted in 1989. The selection of Lake by the Steelers was immediately labeled a reach by NFL draft analyst Mel Kiper.

1989
On May 10, 1989, the Pittsburgh Steelers signed Lake to a three-year, $850,000 contract.

Head coach Chuck Noll named Lake the starting strong safety to begin his rookie season, alongside free safety Thomas Everett and cornerbacks Rod Woodson and Dwayne Woodruff. Lake played his first three seasons under defensive backs coach John Fox.

He made his professional regular season debut and first career start in the Pittsburgh Steelers' season-opening 51–0 loss to the Cleveland Browns. On October 15, 1989, Lake recorded five combined tackles, made two pass deflections, recovered a fumble, and made his first career interception during a 17–7 win at the Cleveland Browns in Week 6. Lake made a one-handed interception off of a pass by Browns' quarterback Bernie Kosar. His exceptional performance in Week 6 earned him AFC Defensive Player of the Week Award. In Week 9, Lake made his first career sack on Broncos' quarterback John Elway in the Steelers' 34–7 loss at the Denver Broncos. He finished his rookie season in 1989 with 70 combined tackles, six fumble recoveries, two forced fumbles, one interception, and one sack in 15 games and 15 starts.

The Pittsburgh Steelers finished the season third in the AFC Central with a 9–7 record and earned a wildcard berth. On December 31, 1989, Lake started in his first career playoff game as the Steelers defeated the Houston Oilers 26–23 in the AFC Wildcard Game. The following week, they lost 24–23 at the Denver Broncos in the AFC Divisional Round.

1990
The Pittsburgh Steelers promoted linebackers coach Dave Brazil to defensive coordinator after Rod Rust accepted the head coaching position with the New England Patriots. Brazil retained Lake and Thomas Everett as the starting safety tandem in 1990. Lake started in all 16 games in 1990 and recorded 67 combined tackles, two forced fumbles, a fumble recovery, an interception, and a sack.

1991
Head coach Chuck Noll retained Lake and Thomas Everett as the starting safety tandem in 1991, along with cornerbacks Rod Woodson and D. J. Johnson. On December 27, 1991, Pittsburgh Steelers' head coach Chuck Noll announced his decision to retire after the Steelers finished with a 7–9 record in 1991. He started in all 16 games in 1991 and recorded 83 combined tackles and a sack.

1992
On January 21, 1992, the Pittsburgh Steelers announced the hiring of former Kansas City Chiefs' defensive coordinator Bill Cowher as their new head coach. On January 31, 1992, Cowher announced the hiring of former New Orleans Saints' secondary coach Dom Capers as their new defensive coordinator.

On August 24, 1992, the Pittsburgh Steelers signed Lake to a three-year contract.

Head coach Bill Cowher retained Lake the starting strong safety in 1992. Lake started alongside free safety Darren Perry and cornerbacks Rod Woodson and D.J. Johnson. He started in all 16 games in 1992 and recorded 85 combined tackles and two sacks.

1993
Lake and Darren Perry returned as the starting safety duo in 1993 and played under defensive backs coach Dick LeBeau. On September 12, 1993, Lake collected a season-high 11 combined tackles, but was carted off the field due to an injury as the Steelers lost 27–0 at the Los Angeles Rams in Week 2. His injury sidelined him for the next two games (Weeks 3–4). In Week 13, Lake recorded six combined tackles and made a season-high two sacks on Oilers quarterback Warren Moon in the Steelers' 23–3 loss at the Houston Oilers. On December 13, 1993, Lake recorded six combined tackles and made an interception off a pass by Dolphins' quarterback Steve DeBerg during a 21–20 victory at the Miami Dolphins in Week 13. He finished the season with 91 combined tackles, five sacks, a career-high four interceptions, two fumble recoveries, and a forced fumble in 14 games and 14 starts.

1994
Head coach Bill Cowher retained Lake and Darren Perry as the starting safeties in 1994. He started in the Pittsburgh Steelers' season-opener against the Dallas Cowboys and recorded a season-high 12 combined tackles in their 26–9 loss. On December 16, 1994, it was announced that Lake was selected to play in the 1995 Pro Bowl as the Starting Strong Safety, to mark the first Pro Bowl selection of his career. He started in all 16 games in 1994 and recorded 68 combined tackles, three forced fumbles, one fumble recovery, a sack, and an interception.

1995
On February 15, 1995, the Pittsburgh Steelers chose to apply their franchise tag to Lake. August 15, 1995, the Pittsburgh Steelers signed Lake to a four-year, $9.20 million contract that includes a signing bonus of $2 million. Lake and Darren Perry returned as the starting safeties to begin the regular season.

In Week 6, he collected a season-high eight combined tackles during a 20–16 loss at the Jacksonville Jaguars. On October 19, 1995, Lake was moved to cornerback and replaced Alvoid Mays after the Pittsburgh Steelers' defense allowed Bengals' quarterback Jeff Blake to throw three touchdown passes during a 49–31 win at the Cincinnati Bengals. Head coach Bill Cowher moved Lake to cornerback for the remained of the season as a replacement for Rod Woodson who tore his ACL in the season-opener against the Detroit Lions.
On December 15, 1995, it was announced that Lake was selected to the 1996 Pro Bowl as a safety. Lake started in all 16 games in 1995 and recorded 63 combined tackles, 1.5 sacks, one interception, a forced fumble, and fumble recovery. He started in last name regular season games at cornerback.

The Pittsburgh Steelers finished first in the AFC Central with an 11–5 record and earned a first round bye. On January 6, 1996, Lake recorded five combined tackles and intercepted a pass by Bills' quarterback Jim Kelly during a  40–21 win against the Buffalo Bills in the AFC Divisional Round. The following week, the Pittsburgh Steelers defeated the Indianapolis Colts 20–16 in the AFC Championship Game. On January 28, 1996, Lake recorded five combined tackles as the Steelers lost 27–17 to the Dallas Cowboys in Super Bowl XXX.

1996
On December 13, 1996, it was announced that Lake was selected to play in the 1997 Pro Bowl, marking the third consecutive Pro Bowl selection or his career.

1997
In 1997, Lake was named AFC Defensive Player of the Year by the Kansas City Committee of 101. For the second time, Lake played the majority of the season at corner. He also received a vote for MVP from Sports Illustrated writer Peter King, which created a situation where Barry Sanders and Brett Favre tied for the award that season.

Jacksonville Jaguars
In 1999, Lake departed the Pittsburgh Steelers and joined the Jacksonville Jaguars in free agency. The Jaguars signed Lake to a four-year, $18 million contract which made him the highest paid safety in the league. Lake was moved to a new position as Free safety, making the Pro Bowl for a fifth time. He was reunited with Jaguars' defensive coordinator Dom Capers, who had previously held the same position with the Pittsburgh Steelers.

On August 17, 2000, Lake underwent surgery on a recurring injury to his left foot and was expected to miss the entire 2000 NFL season. Lake elected to have a bone graft and had a piece of his hip bone grafted to his injured left foot. Lake had undergone a surgery on his foot in March due to a stress fracture in the navicular bone near his ankle. He underwent another surgery on the foot in May and returned to training camp in August.

On September 2, 2001, the Jaguars released Lake in a salary cap-related maneuver.

Baltimore Ravens
On September 11, 2001, the Baltimore Ravens signed Lake to a one-year, $477,000 contract at the veteran minimum. Lake was reunited Baltimore Ravens' defensive coordinator Marvin Lewis, who was a linebackers coach with the Pittsburgh Steelers from 1992–1995, and former teammates Rod Woodson and Leon Searcy.

Coaching career
In summer 2009, Lake, along with former Steeler Greg Lloyd, was a coaching intern at the Philadelphia Eagles training camp at Lehigh University in Bethlehem, Pennsylvania.

In June 2010, Lake was hired by Jerry Simon to be the assistant coach of the Marina High School boys' basketball team.

On March 7, 2011, Lake was hired as the Pittsburgh Steelers defensive backs coach. He left that position as of February 7, 2018, to "return to California to be a part of his youngest son’s last year of high school football".

Personal life
Lake grew up primarily in Southern California. Lake did, however, live in the San Francisco Bay Area for three years (1979–1981) and attended Bowditch Middle School in Foster City, California. There he also played Pop Warner Football where he was a stand-out tailback and cornerback for those two years.

Carnell attended Culver City High School, where he played varsity football for three years. He started on both sides of the ball as running back and linebacker. He also attended elementary school in Culver City prior to his move to San Francisco.

He and his wife, Monica, have three children. Lake and his family live in Irvine, California. Lake is a member of Alpha Phi Alpha, an African American Greek-letter fraternity. His son, Quentin, plays defensive back for the Los Angeles Rams.

See also
2009 UCLA Bruins football team

References

External links

 UCLA Bruins coaching bio

1967 births
Living people
American football safeties
American football cornerbacks
UCLA Bruins football players
Pittsburgh Steelers players
Jacksonville Jaguars players
Baltimore Ravens players
American Conference Pro Bowl players
Players of American football from Salt Lake City
Tampa Bay Bandits (2022) coaches